The following outline is provided as an overview of and topical guide to the life and influence of Joseph Smith:

Joseph Smith – central figure of Mormonism, whom the teachings of most List of sects in the Latter Day Saint movement hold to be the founding Prophet. Smith is also called the Prophet of the Restoration.

Essence of Joseph Smith 
 Religion
 Monotheism – belief that only one God exists
 Abrahamic Religions – religions Abraham is a direct prophet
 Christianity – monotheistic religion Jesus is the founder 
 latter day saints – the teachings of Jesus needed to be restored because all existing churches fell into a Great Apostasy.
 Joseph Smith is the Prophet who restored many lost teachings of Jesus through Revelations.

Life of Joseph Smith

Early life
 Early life of Joseph Smith
 Place of birth Sharon, Vermont
 Parents:  Lucy Mack Smith, Joseph Smith, Sr.
 Palmyra
 Smith Family Farm
 Second Great Awakening
 Burned-over district
 Sacred Grove (Latter Day Saints)
 First Vision
 Angel Moroni
 Golden Plates
 Urim and Thummim (Latter Day Saints)
 Hill Cumorah
 Alvin Smith (brother of Joseph Smith)
 Seer stones (Latter Day Saints)
 Joseph Smith and the criminal justice system
 Emma Smith - first wife
 reformed Egyptian

1827 to 1830
 Life of Joseph Smith from 1827 to 1830
 Martin Harris (Latter Day Saints)
 Anthon transcript
 Charles Anthon
 Lost 116 pages
 Oliver Cowdery
 Book of Mosiah
 Fayette, New York
 Peter Whitmer
 David Whitmer
 Three Witnesses
 Eight Witnesses
 Book of Mormon
 Church of Christ
 Confirmation (Latter Day Saints)
 Melchizedek priesthood
 Hiram Page
 New Jerusalem
 Sidney Rigdon
 Stake (Latter Day Saints)

1831 to 1837
 Life of Joseph Smith from 1831 to 1834 and Life of Joseph Smith from 1834 to 1837
 United Order
 Elder (Latter Day Saints)
 General conference (Latter Day Saints)
 Melchizedek priesthood (Latter Day Saints)
 Zion (Latter Day Saints)
 Zion's Camp
 First Presidency
 Apostle (Latter Day Saints)
 Seventy (Latter Day Saints)
 Presiding high council
 Kirtland Temple
 Fanny Alger
 Kirtland Safety Society

1838 to 1839
 Life of Joseph Smith from 1838 to 1839
 1838 Mormon War
 Anti-Mormonism
 Sampson Avard
 Danites
 Salt Sermon
 Rigdon's July 4th oration
 Thomas B. Marsh
 Orson Hyde
 Battle of Crooked River
 Lilburn Boggs
 Missouri Executive Order 44
 Haun's Mill massacre
 Liberty Jail
 Brigham Young

1839 to 1844
 Life of Joseph Smith from 1839 to 1844
 Nauvoo Legion
 John C. Bennett
 Nauvoo, Illinois
 Assistant President of the Church
 plural marriage
 baptism for the dead
 Nauvoo Temple
 Endowment (Mormonism) 
 Relief Society
 Porter Rockwell
 Thomas Ford
 Anointed Quorum

Death
 Death of Joseph Smith
 William Law
 Nauvoo House
 True Church of Jesus Christ of Latter Day Saints
 Nauvoo Expositor
 King Follett discourse
 Thomas C. Sharp
 Warsaw Signal
 Hyrum Smith
 John Taylor
 Willard Richards
 John P. Greene
 Dan Jones
 John S. Fullmer
 Carthage Jail
 Smith Family Cemetery

Legacy

People
Mormons
ex-Mormons

Memorials
Joseph Smith Memorial Building
Joseph Smith Building
Joseph Smith Birthplace Memorial

Churches
Succession crisis (Latter Day Saints)
List of sects in the Latter Day Saint movement
 patrilineal succession
 Samuel H. Smith (Latter Day Saints)
 William Smith (Latter Day Saints)
 Joseph Smith III
 David Hyrum Smith
The Church of Jesus Christ of Latter-day Saints
Brigham Young
Utah Territory
Church of Jesus Christ (Bickertonite)
Rigdonite
Sidney Rigdon
Church of Jesus Christ of Latter Day Saints (Strangite)
letter of appointment
James J. Strang
Community of Christ
Joseph Smith III

Teachings
Teachings of Joseph Smith

Salvation

 Mormon cosmology
 Godhead (Latter Day Saints)
 Ordinance (Latter Day Saints)
 degree of glory

Temple
 Freemasonry and the Latter Day Saint movement
 Endowment (Latter Day Saints)
 Endowment (Mormonism)
 sealing
 Celestial marriage
 Exaltation (Mormonism)

Church organization
 Church of Christ
 Restoration (Latter Day Saints)
 Great Apostasy
 Council of Fifty
 Article of Faith

Priesthood
 Priesthood (Latter Day Saints)
 Melchizedek priesthood (Latter Day Saints)
 Aaronic priesthood (LDS Church)
 Patriarchal priesthood

Polygamy
 Origin of Latter Day Saint polygamy
 Mormonism and polygamy
 Louisa Beaman

Prophecies
List of prophecies of Joseph Smith

Revealed Scriptures

Book of Mormon
Doctrine and Covenants
Pearl of Great Price
 Book of Moses
 Book of Abraham
 Joseph Smith–Matthew
 Joseph Smith–History
 Articles of Faith
Inspired Version of the Bible

Other texts
Lectures on Faith
King Follett discourse

Parents and siblings
Smith family (Latter Day Saints)
Joseph Smith, Sr.
Lucy Mack Smith
Alvin Smith
Hyrum Smith
Samuel H. Smith
William Smith
Katharine Smith Salisbury
Don Carlos Smith
List of descendants of Joseph Smith, Sr. and Lucy Mack Smith

Related Church Presidents 
Community of Christ
Joseph Smith III
Frederick M. Smith
Israel A. Smith
W. Wallace Smith
Wallace B. Smith
Remnant Church of Jesus Christ of Latter Day Saints
Frederick Niels Larsen

Family chart

Family and descendants
List of the wives of Joseph Smith
Children of Joseph Smith
Presiding Patriarch

Latter Day Saints in popular culture 
Main article
Latter Day Saints in popular culture
Depictions
The 19th Wife
A Victim of the Mormons
Advise and Consent
All About Mormons
America (short story)
Angels in America (miniseries)
Around the World in Eighty Days
Bad Bascomb (film)
Bash: Latter-Day Plays
Be Happy Be Mormon
Ben Banks (film)
The Big Gundown
Big Love
The Book of Mormon (musical)
The Book of Mormon: Original Broadway Cast Recording
Burying the Past
Cannibal! The Musical
The Cremaster Cycle
Darger family
Doom novels
The Duchess and the Dirtwater Fox
Escape (Jessop and Palmer book)
The Folk of the Fringe
The Fringe (short story)
Georgia Rule
The Girl from Utah
The Great Brain
Latter Days
Lost Boys (novel)
Married to a Mormon
Messenger of Death
Millions (2004 film)
The Monkey Wrench Gang
More New Arabian Nights: The Dynamiter
The Mormons (miniseries)
Mountain Meadows massacre and the media
New York Doll
Orgazmo
The Other Side of Heaven
Pageant Wagon (short story)
Paint Your Wagon (film)
Paint Your Wagon (musical)
The Parafaith War
Polygamy, USA
Probably (South Park)
The Prophet, the Gold and the Transylvanians
Riders of the Purple Sage
Roughing It
Salvage (short story)
Secrets of a Gay Mormon Felon
September Dawn
Settling Accounts: Return Engagement
Settling Accounts: The Grapple
Sister Wives
Stolen Innocence
The Strangers (2008 film)
A Study in Scarlet
They Call Me Trinity
Trapped by the Mormons
Under the Banner of Heaven
Wagon Master
West (short story)
Documentaries
Get the Fire
Meet the Mormons
The Mountain Meadows Massacre (film)
Presidents and Prophets

Important places
Joseph Smith Birthplace Memorial
Palmyra (town), New York
Smith Family Farm
Sacred Grove (Latter Day Saints)
Cumorah
Aaronic Priesthood Restoration Site
Peter Whitmer log home
Book of Mormon Historic Publication Site
John Johnson Farm
Zion (Latter Day Saints)
Kirtland, Ohio
Historic Kirtland Village
Kirtland Temple
Zion's Camp
Jackson County, Missouri
Independence, Missouri
Far West, Missouri
Adam-ondi-Ahman
1838 Mormon War
Liberty Jail
Nauvoo, Illinois
History of Nauvoo, Illinois
Nauvoo Historic District
Joseph Smith Mansion House
Nauvoo House
Red Brick Store
Nauvoo Temple
Carthage Jail
Smith Family Cemetery

Works about him
Works relating to Joseph Smith
History of the Church (Joseph Smith)
History of Joseph Smith by His Mother
Teachings of the Prophet Joseph Smith (book)
No Man Knows My History
Joseph Smith: The Making of a Prophet
An Insider's View of Mormon Origins
Joseph Smith: Rough Stone Rolling
The Joseph Smith Papers

See also

Index of articles related to The Church of Jesus Christ of Latter-day Saints
Outline of The Church of Jesus Christ of Latter-day Saints
Outline of the Book of Mormon

External links

 
 
 
 Official LDS page about Joseph Smith
 JosephSmithPapers.org—An LDS Church project compiling primary documents relating to Joseph Smith

 
Smith, Joseph
Smith, Joseph